The New York Guitar Festival is a music festival founded by radio host and author John Schaefer and musician, producer and curator David Spelman, who serves at the festival's Artistic Director. Since 1999, the festival "has been examining virtually every aspect of the guitar's musical personality," and has launched sister festivals in cities in the United States, Europe, Canada and Australia. Festival events take place at venues including Carnegie Hall, The World Financial Center Winter Garden, The 92nd Street Y, Merkin Concert Hall, Joe's Pub, The Jazz Standard, Le Poisson Rougue, Flushing Town Hall, Makor, BB King Blues Club, The Monkey, Barbes, and The Apple Store, SoHo.

Commissions and Premieres
NYGF 2010: The festival commissioned scores by Justin Vernon of Bon Iver, Marc Ribot, James Blackshaw, Gyan Riley, David Bromberg, Steve Kimock, Alex de Grassi, and Chicha Libra, for classic silent films by Charlie Chaplin, Buster Keaton and Harry Everett Smith.

NYGF 2008: Premieres by Arthur Kampela and Stephan Crump's Rosetta Trio.

NYGF 2006: New film scores, instrumental works, and multimedia collaborations by Bill Frisell, Daniel Lanois, Bryce Dessner, Dominic Frasca, Gyan Riley, Leni Stern, Henry Kaiser, Brandon Ross, and Alex de Grassi.

Featured Performers

Ben Allison
Badi Assad
Sergio Assad
Pierre Bensusan
Rory Block
Oren Bloedow
Roy Book Binder
Kevin Breit
Anouar Brahem
Brazilian Guitar Quartet
David Bromberg
Bob Brozman
Jim Campilongo
The Campbell Brothers
Larry Campbell
California Guitar Trio
Laura Cantrell
Vinicius Cantuaria
Cindy Cashdollar
Jen Chapin Trio
Chocolate Genius, Inc.
Larry Coryell
Yamandu Costa
William Coulter
Marshall Crenshaw
Alex de Grassi
Bryce Dessner
Mamadou Diabate
Abdoulaye Diabate
Roland Dyens
Mark Eitzel
Eliot Fisk
Dominic Frasca
Bill Frisell
Kevin R. Gallagher
Mick Goodrick
Emmylou Harris
Jesse Harris
Alvin Youngblood Hart
Ernie Hawkins
Levon Helm
Megan Hickey
Jolie Holland
Jason Isbell
Stevie Jackson
Henry Kaiser
Jorma Kaukonen
Steve Kimock
Lenny Kaye
Kaki King
Leo Kottke
Sonny Landreth
Daniel Lanois
The Last Town Chorus
Patty Larkin
Jim Lauderdale
Greg Leisz
Romero Lubambo
Gary Lucas
Virginia Luque
Russell Malone
Michael Manring
Harry Manx
Martha Masters
Bill Morrissey
Wolfgang Muthspiel
The National
Ollabelle
New World Guitar Trio
Jimmy Norman
Paul O'Dette
Christopher Parkening
The Persuasions
Kelly Joe Phelps
Bucky Pizzarelli
Toshi Reagon
Vernon Reid
John Renbourn
Tony Rice
Marc Ribot
Terry Riley
Pepe Romero
Peter Rowan
Julia Sarr
Mike Seeger
Sex Mob
Simon Shaheen
Elliott Sharp
Michelle Shocked
Bill Sims
Ricky Skaggs & Kentucky Thunder
GE Smith
Hopkinson Smith
Tim Sparks
Bruce Springsteen
David Starobin
Leni Stern
Mark Stewart
Marty Stuart
Andy Summers
Taj Mahal
Otis Taylor
Teddy Thompson
Steve Tibbetts
Tin Hat Trio
David Torn
Artie Traum
David Tronzo
Tony Trischka
Toubab Krewe
Turtle Island String Quartet
Justin Vernon
Ana Vidovic
Jason Vieaux
Frank Vignola
Martha Wainwright
George Winston
Min Xiao-Fen
Dan Zanes
Zubot and Dawson
Natalia Zukerman

About John Schaefer
John Schaefer has hosted and produced the popular new-music radio program New Sounds since 1982. Schaefer's program was called "The #1 radio show for the Global Village" by Billboard magazine. He is also executive producer and host of the nationally syndicated series Chamber Music New York. Since 1986, he has produced and hosted New Sounds Live, an annual series of live broadcast concerts devoted to many types of new, unusual and overlooked forms of music. Since 1991 he has produced and hosted WNYC's programs of classical performances, both in studio and in various concert halls. He has been heard regularly on the BBC, the ABC (Australia), Taipei Public Radio and Radio New Zealand. Schaefer's writings include New Sounds: A Listener's Guide to New Music (Harper & Row, NY, 1987; Virgin Books, London, 1990); a biography of composer La Monte Young (in Sound and Light, Bucknell University Press, 1996); and Songlines: The Voice in World Music (Cambridge Companion to Singing, Cambridge University Press, UK, 2000). He was contributing editor for Spin and Ear magazines, and has written numerous articles and reviews. His liner notes appear on more than 100 recordings, ranging from The Music of Cambodia to recordings by Yo-Yo Ma, Bobby McFerrin, and Terry Riley.

In 2003 Schaefer joined an elite group of honorees when he was presented with the American Music Center's prestigious Letter of Distinction for his "substantial contributions to advancing the field of contemporary American music in the United States and abroad."

In May 2006, New York Magazine cited Schaefer as one of "the people whose ideas, power, and sheer will are changing New York" in its Influentials issue.

About David Spelman
David Spelman was educated at the Peabody Institute of the Johns Hopkins University and the New England Conservatory. In addition to his work with the New York Guitar Festival, he works as a music supervisor in the film industry and serves as an artistic advisor to festivals at the Krannert Center for the Performing Arts at the University of Illinois, the Concertgebouw of Amsterdam, Australia's Adelaide Festival Centre, and Toronto's Luminato Festival.

As a visual arts curator, Spelman has organized gallery exhibits by photographers Ralph Gibson, Danny Clinch, Andy Summers, Jack Vartoogian, Steve Sherman, Rahav Segev, and Hank O'Neal. He has also organized an exhibition of vintage music posters by Milton Glaser.

In the 1980s, Spelman trained in acoustic guitar design and construction under luthier Jeff Trougott.

Guitar Harvest
Guitar Harvest is a two-CD recording produced by David Spelman and John Schaefer in 2003, featuring Andy Summers, Bill Frisell, Vernon Reid, Ralph Towner, Henry Kaiser, Alex de Grassi and other artists.  Mojo gave it a four-star review, saying "This largely acoustic set is guaranteed to leave guitar buffs drooling," while Total Guitar noted that "Not only does it feature some of the most astonishing guitar playing we've heard all year… but all proceeds go to buying guitars and guitar lessons for inner city kids."

Notes

External links
 Official Site
 YouTube Channel
 Blog
 Bach, Celebrated With Strings:
 Axes and Macs:
 Bach's Music as a Blank Canvas for Guitarists:
 Silent Films/Live Guitars/Justin Vernon at the New York Guitar Festival:
 A Stew of Americana Served Up as a Serene Soundtrack:
 A Guitar Festival Begins With a Trip to 'Nebraska'
 Springsteen Album Ignites A Guitar Festival
 The Guitar Goes Home to Spain, After Brief Wanderings:
 Some Memorable Lunacy On Layers of Refinement:
 Turning Guitars Into Gongs and Bedsprings:

Music festivals in New York City